Senator Heflin may refer to:

Howell Heflin (1921–2005), U.S. Senator from Alabama from 1979 to 1997
James Thomas Heflin (1869–1951), U.S. Senator from Alabama from 1920 to 1931
Robert Stell Heflin (1815–1901), Georgia State Senate and Alabama State Senate